Loxostege graeseri is a moth in the family Crambidae. It was described by Staudinger in 1892. It is found in the Russian Far East (Amur).

References

Moths described in 1892
Pyraustinae